The Committee for Another Policy, abbreviated to CAP, was a Belgian left-wing political movement that was established in 2005, and became a political party in 2006.

Formation
The initiators of the committee are the Belgian politicians Jef Sleeckx (former SP.A-MP), Lode Van Outrive (former MEP for the SP.A, and former ABVV) and ETUC chairman Georges Debunne. All three have been active in the Belgian socialist movement for several decades.

On 28 October 2006, a foundation congress took place at the ULB in Brussels. Various existing left-wing groups, like the LSP, the KP and the SAP, committed their support to the idea of a new broad left-wing political formation.

Elections in 2007
At a second congress, held on 3 February 2007, it was decided by a great majority of the participants to take part in the Belgian federal elections of 10 June 2007. The CAP participated with 239 candidates in these elections and got 0.4% of the vote for both the Chamber of People's Representatives and the Senate.

Election results

Federal Parliament

References

External links
 Official website (Dutch)
 Official website (French)

Defunct socialist parties in Belgium
Political party alliances in Belgium
Political parties established in 2005
2005 establishments in Belgium